Fortification Range Wilderness is a  wilderness area in Lincoln County, in the U.S. state of Nevada.

Most of the range is gentle ridges, though the north end is very rugged and precipitous and contains sheer cliffs and massive outcrops.

Flora and fauna
A variety of vegetation grows in the Fortification Range Wilderness, including ponderosa pine, pinyon pine, juniper, aspen, and cottonwood trees in the northern portion of the Wilderness.  The southern portion is densely forested with pinyon and juniper.  Common wildlife found the Wilderness includes mule deer, antelope, mountain lion, and various raptors.

Recreation
Popular recreational activities in the Fortification Range Wilderness include hiking, camping, backpacking, photography, nature study, horseback riding, fishing and hunting.

See also
List of wilderness areas in Nevada
List of U.S. Wilderness Areas
Wilderness Act

References

External links
Fortification Range Wilderness - Nevada BLM
Fortification Range Wilderness map - Nevada BLM
Fortification Range Wilderness - Friends of Nevada Wilderness
Fortification Range Wilderness - Wilderness.net

Wilderness areas of Nevada
Protected areas of Lincoln County, Nevada
Bureau of Land Management areas in Nevada
Protected areas established in 2004
2004 establishments in Nevada